Carabinieri is an Italian television series that aired on Canale 5 from March 2002 to 30 July 2008. The series is an action thriller with added elements of comedy, and has been compared to the soap opera format. It told the story of the military police (Carabinieri) barracks located in Città della Pieve.

Cast

 Manuela Arcuri: Paola Vitali (s.1–2)
 Ettore Bassi: Andrea Ferri (s.1–4)
 Andrea Roncato: Costante Romanò (s.1–7)
 Alessandro Partexano: Antonio Mura (s.1–7)
 Lorenzo Crespi: Tommaso Palermo (s.1) 
 Pino Caruso: Giuseppe Capello (s.1–2)
 Martina Colombari:Infermiera Gioia Capello (s.1–2, 6)
 Roberto Farnesi: Luigi Testa (s.2–4)
 Alessia Marcuzzi: Andrea Sepi (s.3–5)
 Luca Argentero: Marco Tosi (s.4–6)
 Walter Nudo: Giacomo Contini (s.6–7)
 Francesca Chillemi: Laura Flestero (s.6–7) 
 Paolo Villaggio: Giovanni (s.1–5); Padre Paolo (s.7) 
 Massimo Rinaldi: Maurizio Ranieri (s.1–2)
 Francesco Giuffrida: Leonardo Bini (s.1–4)
 Giampiero Lisarelli: Carlo Prosperi (s.1–5)
 Vincenzo Crocitti: Vittorio Bordi (s.1–6) 
 Orso Maria Guerrini: Lorenzo Sepi (s.4–5) 
 Ines Nobili: Barbara Fulci (s.5–6)
 Massimiliano Varrese: Antonio Baldi (s.5–7)
 Roberta Giarrusso: Sonia Martini (s.3–7)
 Maurizio Casagrande: Bruno Morri (s.5–7) 
 Katia Beni: Tina (s.1–6)
 Erika Blanc: Gemma (s.1–6)
 Dario Vergassola: Pippo (s.1–6)
 Eleonora di Miele: Jessica (s. 1–5) 
 Katia Ricciarelli: Monica (s.7)
 Lia Tanzi: Margherita (s.6–7)
 Valeria Cavalli: Sara de Nittis (s.5–7)
 Valentina Pace: Paola (s.6–7)
 Alessia Ventura: Roberta Dei Casati (s.7)
 Daniel Emilio Baldock: Venturi

Episodes

See also
 List of Italian television series

External links
 

Italian television series
2002 Italian television series debuts
Television shows set in Florence
Canale 5 original programming